Hans Hirschfeld (29 May 1899, in Bremen – 4 November 1961, in The Hague) was a Dutch economist.

1899 births
1961 deaths
Dutch economists
Erasmus University Rotterdam alumni
Writers from Bremen
Dutch people of Jewish descent
Dutch collaborators with Nazi Germany